Li Yuan-chia (1929–1994) was a Chinese artist, poet and curator. He incorporated installations, works and photography into his art, and was one of a small number of artists of Chinese background active in the UK during his lifetime.

Early life and Taiwan
Li Yuan-chia was born in Guangxi, China. He was educated in Taiwan from 1949.

Li Yuan-chia was one of the Ton Fan group (東方畫會) that formed in Taiwan by 1956, also known as Orient Movement or Dongfang Huahui. It is credited with establishing modern abstract art in Chinese circles. Li was one of a number of students of Li Chung-sheng (李仲生, Pinyin Li Zhongsheng) in Ton Fan, who collectively became known as the "Eight Great Outlaws" (八大響馬).

The group exhibited in 1957 at the São Paulo Art Biennial. In Taipei in November 1957 they held a collective exhibition, including works by Spanish painters obtained by Hsiao Chin. This was the first of 15 shows to 1971, but the group became less active because of the emigration of many of its members. A 25th anniversary show took place in 1981.

Li Chung-sheng later commented on Li Yuan-chia's initial development by a facile calligraphic style, but also as an early Chinese conceptual artist.

In Italy and London
Li spent time in Italy, in Bologna and Milan; he was a founder of the Punto group, rejoining Hsiao Chin (蕭勤, Pinyin Xiao Qin), and was resident in Bologna in 1965.<ref>Hsiao Chin, who has been traveling extensively in Europe and sending back reports of new developments in art to artist friends and newspapers in Taiwan, settles in Milan. There he establishes Il Punto (The Point) group with the Italian painter Antonio Calderara and the Japanese sculptor Kengiro Azuma. Hsiao Chin invites artists from Ton Fan to join him in Milan and several (including Li) do.</ref>

Li Yuan-chia moved to London in 1965 where he exhibited with David Medalla and later at the Lisson Gallery. He participated in the 1966 Signals 3 + 1 exhibition, organised by Paul Keeler and Anthony de Kedrel, with Hsiao Chin, Ho Kan, and Pia Pizzo.

In the North of England
In 1968 Li Yuan-chia moved to the area of Brampton (now in Cumbria) in North West England. After two years residence near Lanercost, he purchased a derelict farmhouse at Banks on Hadrian's Wall from the artist Winifred Nicholson. By his own efforts and with scant resources he converted the farmhouse into the LYC Museum and Art Gallery and opened it in 1972. A local artist friend was Audrey Barker. The Museum was described by Hunter Davies in his book A Walk along the Wall, who noted among its exhibits a piece by Takis and a painting by Alfred Wallis.

The LYC exhibited artists such as Andy Goldsworthy and David Nash. Rosie Leventon, Rose Frain, Kate Nicholson and Bill Woodrow held solo shows there during the 1980s. It also encouraged the creative efforts of children, some of whom went on to successful careers in the arts.

Gaining increasing recognition for his enterprise, after a year or two Li was awarded funding from the Arts Council, making it possible for the Museum to continue its activities for the ten years he had originally planned.

Death and legacy
Li Yuan-chia died of cancer. There was a 1998 memorial exhibition of his work in Taipei. A retrospective of his work and career was shown in London at the Camden Arts Centre in 2001.

Exhibitions
 São Paulo Biennale 1957
 São Paulo Biennale 1959
 Stadisches Museum Leverkusen 1960
 Obelisko Gallery Rome
 White - White 1965
 Signals London Soundings Two 1966
 Signals London Soundings 3 + 1 = Li Y - C etc.
 Lisson Gallery
 Cosmic Point 1967
 The Other Story, Hayward Gallery, 1989–90
 Camden Arts Centre, 26 January - 18 March 2001; Kendal, Cumbria: Abbot Hall Art Gallery, Kendal 28 March - 3 June; Palais des Beaux-Arts, Brussels 6 July - 9 September 2001

See also
British art
Chinese art
Taiwanese art

References

 Guy Brett and Nick Sawyer (2000) Li Yuan-Chia: Tell Me What is Not Yet Said (London: Institute of International Visual Arts)
 Guy Brett, Li Yuan-chia 1929-1994, Third Text'' n28/9, Autumn/Winter 1994, 3-4: obituary

Notes

External links
 LYC Foundation page
 The Estate of Li Yuan-chia
 Spotlight On: LI Yuan-Chia at Richard Saltoun
 INIVA archive page, Li Yuan-chia 
 INIVA archive page, Exhibitions+Projects
 Tate Collection page
  Page in Encyclopedia of Taiwan.
 Exploring the Wasteland, 2012 exhibition.

1929 births
1991 deaths
Artists from Guangxi
Chinese curators
Republic of China poets
British people of Chinese descent
Taiwanese artists
British curators
20th-century poets
Poets from Guangxi